Maryam Imanieh is the wife of Mohammad Javad Zarif. They married in 1979. 
She is known for her role in negotiations leading to the Joint Comprehensive Plan of Action.

References

Living people
Date of birth missing (living people)
21st-century Iranian women politicians
21st-century Iranian politicians
Scholars of Sufism
Rumi scholars
Year of birth missing (living people)